Danny Adler (born 1949) is an American blues-rock guitarist.

Adler was born in Cincinnati, Ohio, United States. After playing with leading Cincinnati musicians, such as Bootsy Collins, Slim Harpo, H-Bomb Ferguson and Albert Washington, in the early 1960s, he went to San Francisco in 1969 to join John Lee Hooker, T-Bone Walker, Solomon Burke, and experimental group Elephant's Memory.

Moving to England in 1971, he founded Roogalator, one of the first signings by the fledgling Stiff Records, as well as appearing regularly with Rocket 88, the back-to-the-roots boogie-woogie band which included Rolling Stones drummer Charlie Watts, Ian Stewart, Jack Bruce and many other leading UK-based musicians.

In 1980 he put together another blues-rock revival band, the De Luxe Blues Band, with Bob Hall, Bob Brunning and Micky Waller. Dick Heckstall-Smith would join soon after. The band originated as a pick-up band to accompany visiting American blues performers Eddie Clearwater and Carey Bell but stayed together for over 12 years and recorded five albums. They disbanded when Adler returned to the US in 1990, although Brunning would later revive the band with a new line-up.

In 1989, Adler tried to dupe the blues community by 'discovering' a long lost blues musician, Otis "Elevator" Gilmore. A major blues reissue label fell for the ploy, and issued an album supposedly by Gilmore, when it was simply the work of Adler.  Eventually the hoax was discovered and the album was withdrawn, although copies circulated for years afterwards on a white label.

Discography
The Roogalator Years – 1975–1978
Early Danny Adler – Roogalator 1975–1978
Funky Afternoons – 1979
Gusha Gusha Music – 1980
A Street Car Named De Luxe – The De Luxe Blues Band (1981)
Live at Half Moon Putney – The De Luxe Blues Band (1981)
The Danny Adler Band Live – 1982
The Danny Adler Band – 1983
Urban De Luxe – The De Luxe Blues Band (1983)
Hubcap Heaven – 1986
Otis "Elevator" Gilmore – 1986
Hometowns and High Iron – 1987
Night Shift – 1987
The De Luxe Blues Band – 1988
Motorvating – The De Luxe Blues Band (1988)
Mackinaw City – 1989
Homestretch – 1990
Jazzin At RVG's – 1993
Mother's Day – 1999
Bit Of Beatles - 2017

References

External links
 
 Danny Adler on iTunes

1949 births
Living people
Blues rock musicians
American rock guitarists
American male guitarists
Musicians from Cincinnati
Guitarists from Ohio
20th-century American guitarists
20th-century American male musicians